The Weatherby SA-08 is a semi-automatic shotgun marketed by Weatherby Inc. The shotgun is available in either 12 or 20 gauge. Like the Weatherby PA-08 pump-action shotgun, this shotgun constitutes Weatherby's low-end shotgun line. The SA-08 is manufactured in Turkey for Weatherby.
This semi-automatic uses a dual valve system which require to be manually changed out when moving from light to heavy loads and vice versa.

Models
The SA-08 is available in six models. All 12 and 20 gauge models come with improved cylinder modified and full choke tubes. 12 gauge models weigh  and 20 gauge models weigh

Upland

Synthetic
The Synthetic is offered with similar options as the Upland with the exception that it comes with an injected molded synthetic stock.

Waterfowl 3.0
The Waterfowl 3.0 is similar to the Synthetic but only comes in a 12 gauge. A special dipping process is used to adhere the Mothwing Marsh Mimicry camouflage to all metal and synthetic components of the firearm.

Synthetic Youth
The Synthetic Youth model is similar to the Synthetic except that it is available only in 20 gauge and comes with a  barrel.

Deluxe
The Deluxe model is similar to and is available in the same options as the Upland model. The stock and metal work have a high gloss finish.

Entre Rios
The Entre Rios is a shotgun for the shooting of doves. Finish is similar to that of the Deluxe model. This model comes with skeet, improved cylinder and modified chokes.

Semi-automatic shotguns